The Photographer's Mail was the only commercial photography industry publication in New Zealand. It was a monthly broadsheet newspaper published eleven times a year, that was distributed free to the professional photography community.

History and profile
The Photographer's Mail was launched in 1991 as a free magazine. The magazine was purchased by Parkside Media in 2007 to complement D-Photo magazine which focuses more on consumer and enthusiast photography.

In January 2010, it was announced that Parkside Media was to suspend publication of The Photographer's Mail for the time being, in a statement from the editor, published in the forums of the sister title D-Photo. The Photographer's Mail was restarted as a bi-monthly magazine and is currently in print by Parkside Media.

Magazine contents
As of the November 2008 issue, the typical contents included:
Editor column
Readers' letters
Exhibition listings
USA report
New Zealand photography news, including new product releases
Competition
Interview with a professional photographer
PSNZ, AIPA and NZIPP news
Trade noticeboard
Image editing tutorial
How-to feature

Website
The Photographer's Mail shared its website with D-Photo. Daily news articles were available weekdays which were additional to magazine content. Full magazine articles were available from previous issues, often including additional photos and information (including videos) that could not be fitted into the magazine. No physical back issues are stored of the magazine.

References

External links

1991 establishments in New Zealand
Bi-monthly magazines
Magazines established in 1991
Magazines published in New Zealand
Mass media in Auckland
Monthly magazines published in New Zealand
Photography in New Zealand
Photography magazines